Hector Stewart Ramsey Lawson (21 May 1896 – 1971) was a Scottish footballer who played as a half back or outside forward in both the Scottish and English Football Leagues.

He was described by the Derby Daily Telegraph as "an outside left who has already made a deep impression, and has speed, ball control, and confidence". He played for a number of clubs including Rangers, Liverpool, Aberdeen and Shamrock Rovers. Born in Shettleston, Lawson played under Bill Struth at Rangers, during the 20th century.

References

External links
Profile at LFCHistory.net
Profile at Rangers FC History

1896 births
1971 deaths
Scottish footballers
Association football wing halves
Association football outside forwards
Rangers F.C. players
Third Lanark A.C. wartime guest players
Vale of Leven F.C. players
Liverpool F.C. players
Airdrieonians F.C. (1878) players
Aberdeen F.C. players
Brighton & Hove Albion F.C. players
Newport County A.F.C. players
Shamrock Rovers F.C. players
Hamilton Academical F.C. wartime guest players
Clyde F.C. wartime guest players
Third Lanark A.C. players
Scottish Football League players
English Football League players
Footballers from Glasgow